Khasbag Stadium is a national wrestling stadium in Kolhapur city, Maharashtra, India. This is a biggest wrestling stadium in India. The stadium was built in the time of Rajarshi Shahu Maharaj and is almost a hundred-year-old stadium. And this is heritage site also.

Khasbag stadium, also known as Khasbaug Maidan (Ground), is 1 kilometre South-East to Mahalaxmi Temple and 8 Kilometers South-West to Central Bus Stand of Kolhapur. The structure flaunts a seating arrangement for about 30,000 people around a Wrestling Ring also called "Houd". Special seating is available for the members of the royal family of Kolhapur on the east side of the wrestling ring.

In 2012, it was the venue for the '46th Hind Kesari wrestling championship'. It was held to mark the centenary of Khasbag wrestling arena.

See also 

 Rajarshi Shahu Stadium
 Shri Chhatrapati Shivaji Stadium

References

Buildings and structures in Kolhapur
Wrestling in India
Sports venues in Kolhapur
20th-century establishments in India
Sports venues completed in the 20th century
Year of establishment missing
20th-century architecture in India